The Order "For Service to the Homeland in the Armed Forces of the USSR", also known as the Order "For Service to the Motherland in the Armed Forces of the USSR", was a Soviet military order awarded in three classes for excellence to military personnel.

Award history
The Order "For Service to the Homeland in the Armed Forces of the USSR" was created on October 28, 1974 by decree of the Presidium of the Supreme Soviet of the USSR, making it the first military order created after the end of World War II.

Award statute
The Order "For Service to the Homeland in the Armed Forces of the USSR" was awarded to soldiers of the Soviet Army, Navy, of Border or Internal Troops: for achievements in combat and political training, for maintaining high combat readiness and developing new military equipment; for high performance in service; for the successful fulfillment of special command tasks; for courage and dedication displayed during the performance of military duties; for other services to the nation while serving in the Armed Forces.

The Order "For Service to the Homeland in the Armed Forces of the USSR" was divided into three classes, first, second and third, the first class being the highest. Each class was awarded sequentially from the third to the first.

Recipients of the Order "For Service to the Homeland in the Armed Forces of the USSR" of any class had the right to:
 priority in the choice of living quarters;
 yearly free round trip personal travel by rail (express or passenger trains), by ship (in first class cabins, express or passenger lines), by air or by long-distance road transport; 
 free personal use of all types of urban passenger transport in rural areas within the limits of the Republic (except for taxis);
 free vouchers to a sanatorium or rest home (once a year on the recommendation of a medical institution);
 extraordinary availability to community services provided by domestic enterprises, cultural or educational institutions; and,
 a 15% increase in pension.

The Order "For Service to the Homeland in the Armed Forces of the USSR" is worn on the right side of the chest after the Order of the Red Star and in order of class seniority. When worn with Orders of the Russian Federation, the latter have precedence.

Award description
The Order "For Service to the Homeland in the Armed Forces of the USSR" consisted of two 58mm by 58mm four pointed stars crossed at a 90° angle, the top star having the vertical and horizontal points. The rear star was enamelled light blue with gilt edges and two crossed convex oxidised silver rockets pointing towards the upper left and upper right. The rockets' nose cones and tail sections were gilded. The top star was made up of diverging rays, at its center, a circular medallion containing a convex five pointed star within an oak wreath on a blue background, surrounded by a white enamelled ribbon with the inscription: "For Service to the Motherland in the Armed Forces of the USSR" on the sides and top, and the image of the hammer and sickle at the bottom. The central medallion was superimposed over an oxidized silver anchor and wings protruding from the top, bottom and both sides. The Order weighed 64,5 grams.

The main differences between the three classes of the Order:
 1st class - top four pointed star and central five pointed star were gilded;
 2nd class - top four pointed star was silver and the central five pointed star was gilded;
 3rd class - top four pointed star and central five pointed star were silver.

The ribbons to be worn on the uniform in the ribbon bar when the Order wasn't worn were:
 1st class - blue with a 6mm wide yellow central stripe;
 2nd class - blue with two 3mm wide yellow central stripes 1mm apart;
 3rd class - blue with three 2mm wide yellow central stripes 1mm apart.

Recipients 
The first investiture of the Order "For Service to the Homeland in the Armed Forces of the USSR" 3rd class took place on February 17, 1975, the first orders 2nd class were awarded on July 30, 1976 and the first awards 1st class in 1982. From 1975 to the disestablishment of the order following the 1991 dissolution of the Soviet Union, 69,576 orders 3rd class, 589 2nd class and only 13 1st class (Full Cavaliers) were awarded. Below are (incomplete) lists of the recipients:

Full cavaliers (complete list) 
 Major General Vasily Shcherbakov (11 February 1982)
 Lieutenant General Ivan Kolodyazhny (11 February 1982)
 Colonel General Ivan Zavyalov (16 February 1982)
 Captain 1st class Vasily Poroshin (16 February 1982)
 Colonel Genady Loshkarev (17 May 1982)
 Lieutenant General Albert Bobrovsky (27 December 1982)
 Captain 1st grade Aleksandr Kazakov (27 December 1982)
 Colonel Yuri Orlov (27 December 1982)
 Major General of Internal Troops Aleksandr Verevkin (1 March 1989)
 Admiral Valery Sergeev (5 May 1989)
 Colonel Boris Agapov (24 May 1989)
 Colonel General Georgy Baydukov (25 May 1987)
 Colonel General Vladislav Achalov (22 February 1990)

Cavaliers of the 2nd and 3rd classes (partial list) 
 Army General Igor Nikolayevich Rodionov
 Admiral Vladimir Grigoryevich Yegorov
 Admiral of the Fleet Feliks Nikolayevich Gromov
 Marshal of Aviation Yevgeniy Yakovlevich Savitskiy
 Army General Viktor Petrovich Dubynin
 Former Colonel and 3rd President of the Chechen Republic of Ichkeria Aslan (Khalid) Aliyevich Maskhadov
 Lieutenant General and politician Alexander Ivanovich Lebed

Cavaliers of the 3rd class (partial list) 
 Army General Nikolay Yegorovich Makarov
 Lieutenant Colonel Anatoly Vyacheslavovich Lebed
 Lieutenant General Vladimir Anatolyevich Shamanov
 Marshal of the Soviet Union Sergei Leonidovich Sokolov 
 Marshal of Aviation Alexander Ivanovich Pokryshkin
 Marshal of the Soviet Union Ivan Ignatyevich Yakubovsky
 Marshal of the Soviet Union Sergey Fyodorovich Akhromeyev
 Admiral of the Fleet Vladimir Vasilyevich Masorin
 Colonel General Gennady Nikolayevich Troshev
 Army General Anatoly Vasiliyevich Kvashnin
 Cosmonaut Major General Andriyan Grigoryevich Nikolayev
 Cosmonaut Major General Alexey Arkhipovich Leonov
 Cosmonaut Lieutenant General Georgy Timofeyevich Beregovoy
 Cosmonaut Major General Vladimir Aleksandrovich Shatalov
 Cosmonaut Colonel Boris Valentinovich Volynov
 Cosmonaut Colonel General Pyotr Ilyich Klimuk
 Lieutenant General and Military Conductor Valery Mikhaylovich Khalilov 
 Cosmonaut Major General Vladimir Aleksandrovich Dzhanibekov
 Cosmonaut Major General Vladimir Vasiliyevich Kovalyonok
 Test Cosmonaut Colonel Viktor Mikhailovich Afanasyev
 Marshal of the Soviet Union Aleksandr Mikhaylovich Vasilevsky
 Cosmonaut Colonel Anatoly Nikolayevich Berezovoy
 Cosmonaut Colonel Valery Ilyich Rozhdestvensky
 Marshal of the Soviet Union Kirill Semyonovich Moskalenko
 Lieutenant General and politician Ruslan Sultanovich Aushev
 Captain 3rd Rank Valery Mikhailovich Sablin
 Admiral of the Fleet of the Soviet Union Sergey Georgiyevich Gorshkov
 Hero of Belarus Uładzimir Mikałajevič Karvat
 Marshal of the Soviet Union Viktor Georgiyevich Kulikov

See also 
 :Category:Recipients of the Order "For Service to the Homeland in the Armed Forces of the USSR", 1st class
 :Category:Recipients of the Order "For Service to the Homeland in the Armed Forces of the USSR", 2nd class
 :Category:Recipients of the Order "For Service to the Homeland in the Armed Forces of the USSR", 3rd class

References 

 Great Soviet Encyclopedia, entry on "Orders of the USSR"

External links
 Legal Library of the USSR

1974 establishments in the Soviet Union
1991 disestablishments in the Soviet Union
Awards disestablished in 1991
Awards established in 1974
Military awards and decorations of the Soviet Union